Linaria maroccana is a species of flowering plant in the plantain family known by the common names Moroccan toadflax and annual toadflax. It is native to Morocco, but it can be found elsewhere growing wild as an introduced species, such as California. It is a readily available ornamental plant for the flower garden. The inflorescence is a raceme of flowers occupying the top of the stem. At the base of each flower is a calyx with five narrow, pointed lobes. The flower is often purple in color with white near the throat, but flowers of many different colors are bred for the garden. Dwarf cultivars are also available.

The cultivar group Fairy Bouquet has gained the Royal Horticultural Society’s Award of Garden Merit.

References

External links
Photo gallery

maroccana
Flora of Morocco
Flora of North Africa
Plants described in 1872